The Vaige is a  long river in the Mayenne and Sarthe departments in western France.

This list is ordered from source to mouth: 
In Mayenne, the Vaige has its source in Saint-Léger then waters the following villages: Vaiges, Saint-Georges-le-Fléchard, La Bazouge-de-Chemeré, La Cropte, Saint-Denis-du-Maine, Préaux, Ballée, Beaumont-Pied-de-Bœuf,
Then the Vaige séparates Mayenne (Saint-Loup-du-Dorat) from Sarthe (Auvers-le-Hamon),
Only in Mayenne the Vaige waters Bouessay, 
Entering the Sarthe department, the Vaige avoid the Sablé-sur-Sarthe town and flows in the Sarthe (right tributary)

Low water and flood
Very often the river uses to dry at the end of summer and the beginning of autumn, so fishes and river mussels die but kingfishers may fly away.

References

Rivers of France
Rivers of Mayenne
Rivers of Sarthe
Rivers of Pays de la Loire